Archbishop Wood Catholic High School is a private, Roman Catholic high school within the Archdiocese of Philadelphia. The school was founded in 1964 in Warminster Township in Bucks County, Pennsylvania. It sits on thirty-two acre tract of land and maintains various athletic fields on its campus, as well as a daycare facility, and a home for retired diocesan priests. It is accredited by both the National Catholic Educational Association and Middle States Association of Colleges and Schools.

School History
Construction began on the campus of Archbishop Wood High Schools in the spring of 1963. It opened its doors to students in the fall of 1964, accepting freshman and sophomore transfers for the first years. It was originally designated as two separate schools, identical in their structure and management, one of boys and girls respectively. Wood was given its named after Philadelphia's 19th-century Archbishop James Frederick Bryan Wood. At its maximum capacity in 1978 it had 2456 students enrolled.

Archbishop Wood High School for boys was among a handful of schools that Buckminster Fuller gave speaking engagements at in 1975.

As of 2016 the campus also includes a childcare center in the former convent which it runs as a joint venture with Nativity of Our Lord Parish, which it neighbors.

Academics
Over 98% of Wood students take the SATs each year, with the average SAT score for its student body at 1200. 75% of the graduating class attend a four-year college, while 19% attend a two-year college.  The student-to-teacher ratio is 18:1 as of 2022.

The school currently offers thirteen Advanced Placement courses available for college-level credit available to juniors and seniors. The school also offers its St. Thomas More Honors program to select students enrolled to assist in college preporation.

Athletics
Archbishop Wood has been a member of the Philadelphia Catholic League since its opening in 1964. It offers various athletics including: Football, Boys & Girls Soccer, Boys & Girls Cross-Country, Field Hockey, Wrestling, Boys & Girls Basketball, Volleyball, Boys & Girls Indoor Track, Bowling, Baseball, Softball, Boys & Girls Lacrosse, Boys & Girls Track, Boys & Girls Swimming, Tennis, Golf, and Club Hockey. Archbishop Wood also utilizes adjacent fields at Munro Park in Warminster and also at neighboring William Tennent High School.

Since opening Wood has fielded various championship athletic teams. These Include:
Boys Soccer: 2004 (PCL), 2014 (PCL; District XII AAA)
Girls Soccer: 1995 (PCL), 2010 (PCL AA, District XII), 2011 (PCL AA)
Girls Volleyball: 2010 (PCL, District XII)
Football: 1974 (PCL, City), 1978 (PCL), 2008 (AAA), 2009 (PCL AAA, District 12 AAA), 2010 (PCL AAA, District 12 AAA), 2011 (PCL AAA, PIAA Class AAA State Champions), 2012 (PCL AAA, District 12 AAA)
Baseball: 1990 (PCL), 1993 (PCL), 2009b, 2010b (District 12 AAA)
Boys Swimming: 2011 (PCL, District XII)
Boys Cross Country: 1969 (PCL, City), 1979 (PCL), 1983 (PCL), 1984 (PCL), 1986 (PCL), 1987 (PCL), 1988 (PCL), 1990 (PCL), 1991 (PCL), 1995 (PCL)
Girls Cross Country: 1995 (PCL), 1996 (PCL), 1997 (PCL), 2010 (PCL, District XII), 2011 (PCL)
Ice Hockey: 2002
Girls Swimming: 2008 (PCL), 2011 (District XII)
Girls Basketball: 1982 (PCL), 2010 (PIAA AAA Class State Champions), 2011 (PCL, PIAA Class AAA State Champions), 2012 (PIAA AAA State Champions), 2017 (PIAA AAAAA State Champions)
Boys Basketball: 2017 (PIAA AAAAA State Champions)
Wrestling: 1980 (PCL, City), 1986 (PCL), 1988 (PCL), 2002 (PCL), 2018 (PCL, District XII)

Wood has also competed in the National High School Cheerleading Championship, finishing with a bronze medalist in 2015, 2016, 2017, 2018. State Finalist 20117, 2018. 2010 (PCL), 2011 States Medium Varsity Division, 2012 National High School Cheerleading Championship Bid Recipient Medium Varsity Division, Ranked 5th in the Nation at NHSCC, 2013 PIAA State Finalist ranked No. 7, 2013 District 12 Medium Champion, 2013 National Finalist Top 12.

Religious communities
From its founding 1964 Wood was staffed by various Catholic religious houses who resided on the property itself. While the school was split by sex the boys' school was staffed by priests and the girls' school by nuns. Over the years various religious communities have run the administration of the school itself, including the Fathers of the Congregation of the Immaculate Heart of Mary (CICM), Vincentian Fathers (CM), Oblates of Saint Francis de Sales (OSFS), Sisters of the Immaculate Heart of Mary (IHM), Sisters of Saint Joseph (SSJ), Religious Sisters of Mercy (RSM), and the Religious of the Assumption (RA). The Belgian Missionhurst Friars who originally staffed the boys' school in 1964 were transfers from Brussels and had previously been instrumental in the native resistance to the occupation of the country by Nazi Germany. The male religious orders left the school in 1991, the IHM sisters left the grounds in 2001. Wood continues to have religious in its faculty proper, but is mainly staffed by laity.

Notable alumni
Henry G. Ulrich III (1968), Four Star Admiral in the U.S. Navy
John Tomaszewski (1969), Pathologist, Professor at the University of Buffalo Jacobs School of Medicine
Andrew M. Allen (1973), American Astronaut and Marine Aviator
Frank Naylor (1977), Professional Football Player, New Jersey Generals
Claire Cardie (1978), American Computer Scientist, Professor at Cornell University
Thomas P. Murt (1978), Member of the Pennsylvania House of Representatives
Mark Kearney (1980), United States District Judge
Marguerite Quinn (1981), Member of the Pennsylvania House of Representatives
Terri Schiavo (1981), A famous legal and ethical case of a woman in an irreversible persistent vegetative state.
Debbie Black (1984), Woman's Basketball Player and Coach
Kelly Greenberg (1986), Former Women's Basketball Coach at the University of Pennsylvania
Irene Molloy (1996), Television Actress
Glen Foster (1998), Reality Television Star, Philadelphia 76ers Mascot 'Little G'
Pam Rosanio (2004), Women's International Basketball Player
Brian O'Grady (2010), Professional Baseball Player for the Cincinnati Reds, Tampa Bay Rays and the San Diego Padres
Colin Thompson (2012), Football Player for the Carolina Panthers
Ryan Bates (2015)
Collin Gillespie (2017) Basketball Player for Villanova University
Mark Webb (2016) Football Player for the Florida Gators and Atlanta Falcons
Kyle Pitts (2018) Football Player for the Atlanta Falcons

See also
 Philadelphia Catholic League
 Archdiocese of Philadelphia

Notes and references

External links
 Official website of Archbishop Wood Catholic High School
 The Viking Voice- Student Newspaper
 Wood Football Website

Catholic secondary schools in Pennsylvania
Roman Catholic Archdiocese of Philadelphia
Educational institutions established in 1964
Schools in Bucks County, Pennsylvania
1964 establishments in Pennsylvania